Aleg is a department of Brakna Region in Mauritania.

List of municipalities in the department 
The Aleg department is made up of following municipalities:

 Aghchorguitt
 Aleg
 Bouhdida
 Cheggar
 Djellwar
 Mal.

In 2000, the entire population of the Aleg Department has a total of 66 262 inhabitants  (31 058 men and 35 204 women).

References 

Departments of Mauritania